iWeb was a template-based WYSIWYG website creation tool developed by Apple Inc. The first version of iWeb was announced at the Macworld Conference & Expo on January 10, 2006 as part of the iLife ’06 suite of digital lifestyle applications. iWeb '11 was released on October 20, 2010 as part of the iLife ’11 suite, though it was not updated from the previous release (version 3.0.2).

iWeb allowed users to create websites and blogs and customize them with their own text, photos, and movies. Users could then publish their websites to MobileMe or another hosting service via FTP. In addition to its ability to publish to MobileMe, iWeb integrated with other services, including Facebook, YouTube, AdSense and Google Maps. Apple ceased development of iWeb in 2011.

Overview and features

Page design 
iWeb allowed users to create and design websites and blogs without coding and included a number of Apple-designed themes, each of which had several page templates with coordinated fonts and colors. Users could customize these pages by replacing placeholder text and by dragging and dropping their own photos and movies into the document. Templates included blog, podcast, and photo and movie gallery pages as well as standard "Welcome" and "About Me" pages.
 
iWeb integrated with other applications in the iLife suite. The iLife Media Browser is a list of all the music, movies, and photos stored in iTunes, iMovie, and iPhoto. Content could be dragged from the Media Browser window and placed in the open page. Local files could also be dropped directly into the page.

Nine interactive "widgets" were included with iWeb. Among other functions, these widgets let users embed YouTube videos and Google Maps, include a countdown timer and add RSS feeds.

Publishing 
iWeb featured built-in support for publishing to MobileMe, a suite of online applications developed by Apple, and to other third-party web hosts with FTP. Once account information was entered, users simply clicked a button to publish their entire website. iWeb could then publish updates to the user's Facebook profile to notify others of changes to the website.

Limitations
iWeb was in its third version at the time of discontinuation, and had a limited feature set and some unresolved bugs. Some limitations included:
 Separate CSS files were created for each page, rather than a single stylesheet for the entire site.
 No option to directly edit the HTML code of templates. HTML support was limited to small snippets that could be embedded into the page.
 Password protection was not supported on non-MobileMe-hosted websites.
 Creating templates required third-party software and was overly complex.
 Comments on blog pages were not supported on non-MobileMe-hosted websites.

Discontinuation of iWeb in iCloud transition 
In June 2011, rumors emerged that iWeb would not be developed further. On June 30, 2012 Apple discontinued MobileMe. All iWeb websites hosted on MobileMe disappeared if not hosted elsewhere. Apple provided instructions of how to move iWeb sites to another host.

References

External links 
 

MacOS-only software made by Apple Inc.
Web development software
Products introduced in 2006
Discontinued software